Porch is a website that connects homeowners with local home improvement contractors. The site  features advice articles, cost guides and online booking for over 160 common home improvement, maintenance, and repair projects.

History
Porch was founded in September 2012 after co-founder Matt Ehrlichman noticed that there was no organized website to find the best home improvement professionals as he was building his home.

Porch was launched as an online home improvement network connecting homeowners with qualified professionals. 

Current listings are in excess of 300,000 active professionals across the U.S. Porch partners with large retailers like Lowe's, Wayfair, and Pottery Barn to provide home services fulfillment for their customers. Porch also offers  direct-to-consumer access to more than 160 different home services offerings through Porch.com associates.

Focused on assisting customers at every stage of the “home journey” – including moving in, installations, assembly, repairs and ongoing maintenance – the company facilitated over 2 million home-related projects in 2017 generating almost $1 billion in revenue for small business owners and sole proprietors in specialty service areas such as plumbing, roofing, electrical work carpentry, and more.

Funding
In June 2013 Porch announced a $6.25 million seed round, including investments from Ron Conway of SV Angel, Javier Olivan, and Jeffrey Skoll.

In September, 2014 Porch reported a $27.6 million Series A round, led by Lowe's. Joe Hanauer, Chairman of Move and former CEO of Coldwell Banker, joined the board of directors.

In January, 2015 Porch reported a $65 million Series B round, led by Valor Equity Partners. Backers included Lowe's, Founders Fund, Battery Ventures, Panorama Point Partners, Capricorn Investment Group and home improvement expert Ty Pennington. Valor Equity Partners’ Antonio Gracias also joined the board of directors.

Lowe's partnership
In April 2014, Porch announced a nationwide partnership with home improvement retailer Lowe's, establishing in-store promotional signage and computer kiosks where customers and sales associates can search Porch's professionals database.

Headquarters Relocation 
In May, 2015, Porch relocated their headquarters to the SODO neighborhood in south Seattle, Washington.

Acquisition of Fountain Software, inc.
In October 2015, Porch announced the acquisition of Fountain, an online service that connects Internet users with a variety of experts through video chats, texts and annotated photos. Fountain was co-founded by Aaron Patzer, the founder of Mint.com, and Jean Sini. Sini joined Porch; Patzer did not.

Wayfair partnership
In April 2016, Wayfair implemented the Porch Retail Solution nationally starting in 15 markets, online and in support centers. Through the Porch Retail Solution, Wayfair.com shoppers who need help with tasks such as furniture assembly and installation of products such as lighting and plumbing will be able to purchase those services at checkout and set an appointment with a qualified Porch professional. This work will be backed by the Porch Guarantee.

Layoffs
After quickly growing to 500 employees Porch began a series of layoffs which resulted in the headcount being reduced to about 250 employees.  In addition, many key executives including the Chief Product Officer, Chief Financial Officer, and Chief Technology Officer left the company.

Renewed Focus and Growth 
In April, 2018, it was announced that Porch had grown to 450 employees, approaching the record number of employees Porch had before the 2015 and 2016 layoffs. Porch is now focused on fast growth in 2018 and beyond, with a strong emphasis on investing in the 100-person EPDA team (engineering, product, design, analytics) and building and expanding strategic and business partnerships.

Addition to Facebook Marketplace 
In May, 2018, Porch was added as a service provider in the home services category of Facebook Marketplace to help people find service professionals in a convenient social experience.

Facebook Marketplace was launched in 2016 and has been growing at a rate of 18 million new listings per month. As of May 2018, 800 million people globally use Facebook Marketplace to buy and sell things each month, including 1 out of 3 Facebook users from the U.S.

References

External links

Online marketplaces of the United States
Companies based in Seattle
American companies established in 2012
Companies listed on the Nasdaq